The BRM P154 is a purpose-built sports prototype race car, designed, developed and built by British Racing Motors to Group 7 racing specifications, specifically to compete in the Can-Am racing series, in 1970. It was BRM's first Can-Am car.

References

Sports prototypes
Can-Am cars